The 87th New York Infantry Regiment (aka "13th Brooklyn" or 13th New York State Militia) was an infantry regiment in the Union Army during the American Civil War.

Service
The 87th New York Infantry was organized at Brooklyn, New York beginning November 14, 1861, and mustered in for three-years' service on November 20, 1861, under the command of Colonel Stephen A. Dodge.

The regiment was attached to 3rd Brigade, Casey's Division, Army of the Potomac, to March 1862. 1st Brigade, 3rd Division, III Corps, Army of the Potomac, to August 1862. 1st Brigade, 1st Division, III Corps, to September 1862.

The 87th New York Infantry ceased to exist on September 6, 1862, when it was consolidated with 40th New York Volunteer Infantry. Company B was transferred to the 173rd New York Volunteer Infantry on September 11, 1862.

Detailed service
Left New York for Washington, D.C., December 2, 1861. Duty in the Department of Washington until March 1862. Advance on Manassas, Va., March 10–15. Ordered to the Peninsula, Va., March 17. Siege of Yorktown April 5 – May 4. Skirmish at Yorktown April 11. Battle of Williamsburg May 5. Battle of Seven Pines or Fair Oaks May 31 – June 1. Seven days before Richmond June 25 – July 1. Battle of Oak Grove June 25. Malvern Hill July 1. At Harrison's Landing until August 16. Movement to Fort Monroe, then to Centreville August 16–26. Pope's Campaign in northern Virginia August 26 – September 2. Action at Bristoe Station or Kettle Run August 27. Buckland's Bridge, Broad Run, August 27. Battle of Groveton August 29. Second Battle of Bull Run August 30. Battle of Chantilly September 1.

Casualties
The regiment lost a total of 49 men during service; 1 officer and 22 enlisted men killed or mortally wounded; 26 enlisted men died of disease.

Commanders
 Colonel Stephen A. Dodge

In popular culture
In Ghostbusters: The Video Game, the regiment are non-player characters as ghosts who haunted the American Museum of Natural History's American Civil War Exhibit and have been fighting against the ghosts of the Confederate's partisan rangers (irregular military) once commanded by John A. Poindexter, failed to realize that they had died, and the war was over. There, the regiment and the Confederate ghosts are being manipulated by the spirits of Ivo Shandor and Cornelius Wellesly to hinder the Ghostbusters before they face Wellesly. In game, the regiment and their opponents are categorized as Class 4 Full-Torsoed Anchored Manifestations, trapped in the mortal plane and unable to move onto the afterlife due to not being at peace.

See also

 List of New York Civil War regiments
 New York in the Civil War

References
 Dyer, Frederick H. A Compendium of the War of the Rebellion (Des Moines, IA: Dyer Pub. Co.), 1908.
 Marten, James Alan. America's Corporal: James Tanner in War and Peace (Athens, GA: The University of Georgia Press), 2014. 
 Ryder, Richard H. The Village Color-Bearer: Together with a Story of a U.S. Life-Saving Service Keeper (New York: G. S. Patton), 1891.
Attribution

External links
 Regimental flag of the 87th New York Infantry

Military units and formations established in 1861
1861 establishments in New York (state)
Military units and formations disestablished in 1862
Infantry 087